Östers Idrottsförening, commonly known as Östers IF or simply Öster, is a Swedish sports club located in Växjö, specializing in football, and playing in the second tier of Swedish football, Superettan.

The club has previously also competed in ice hockey (see separate article), bandy, and bowling. Öster was formed on 20 April 1930 as Östers Fotbollförening, before adopting the name "Östers IF" in 1932. The club is affiliated to the Smålands Fotbollförbund.

In 1968, their first season in Allsvenskan, Öster became the first team ever to win the national title at their first attempt (newly-promoted IF Elfsborg won the league in 1961 but had played in, and been winners of, the championship in the past). This win ignited the team's 'golden age' which lasted until the early 1980s and saw them win a total of four Swedish championships.

On 31 March 2011, Öster broke ground on their new arena, Myresjöhus Arena, which was inaugurated in August 2012. The arena hosted four games of the UEFA Women's Euro 2013 tournament.

History

Öster (English: "East") was named after a district in the city of Växjö. They were not part of the upper divisions in the early days of swedish football and only made their first appearance in the third tier in 1947. During the 1950s and early-1960s the club made a push to raise the level of football by inviting and playing against foreign teams such as Flamengo, Juventus and Fluminense. This coupled with an increase in the amount of training helped the team establish themselves in the second tier.

In 1961 Öster had their first chance ever to qualify for Allsvenskan but ended up in last place in the four team promotion playoffs. Success in the promotion playoffs would instead come six years later in 1967 when they beat IK Brage in the deciding game in front of a home crowd of 26,404 people. Öster defied the odds during their first season in the top division and won the league on goal difference after a total of four teams had ended the season on exactly the same number of points. Following their championship title the club had ten years of solid Allsvenskan finishes before becoming dominant in the late-1970s and early-1980s where they won the league three times in four years.

After that successful era followed a slow decline over the next couple of decades which culminated in their relegation to the second tier in 1998. After that the club has found it hard to reestablish itself in Allsvenskan and has only made short one year appearances.

Current squad

Personnel

Current technical staff

Coaches

 Bertil Bäckvall (1958–63)
 Vilmos Varszegi (1967–73)
 Bengt "Julle" Gustavsson (1973–74)
 Gunnar Nordahl (1975–76)
 Lars "Laban" Arnesson (1977–80)
 Bo Johansson (1980–82)
 Leif Widén (1982–85)
 Bo Johansson (1986–88)
 Peo Bild (1988–89)
 Hans Backe (1989–94)
 Nanne Bergstrand (1994–96)
 Andreas Ravelli (1997–98)
 Bo Axberg (1998)
 Jan Mattsson (1998–01)
 Yevgeni Kuznetsov (2002–03)
 Leif Widén (2003–04)
 Lars Jacobsson (2005–06)
 Giles Stille (1 January 2007 – 31 December 2008)
 Yevgeni Kuznetsov (2008–09)
 Andreas Ottosson (2009–10)
 Ludwig Ernstsson (9 July 2010 – 9 September 2010)
 Hans Gren (10 September 2010 – 31 December 2010)
 Roar Hansen (1 January 2011 – 31 December 2012)
 Andreas Thomsson (1 January 2013 – 29 December 2013)
 Roberth Björknesjö (30 December 2013 – 31 December 2014)
 Thomas Askebrand (1 January 2015 – 4 November 2017)
 Christian Järdler (1 January 2018 – Present)

Achievements

 Swedish Champions
 Winners (4): 1968, 1978, 1980, 1981

League
 Allsvenskan:
 Winners (4): 1968, 1978, 1980, 1981
 Runners-up (3): 1973, 1975, 1992
 Superettan:
 Winners (2): 2002, 2012
 Runners-up (1): 2005
 Division 1 Södra:
 Winners (3): 1989, 2009, 2016
 Runners-up (1): 2008

Cups
 Svenska Cupen:
 Winners (1): 1977
 Runners-up (4): 1974, 1982, 1985, 1991
 Allsvenskan play-offs:
 Runners-up (1): 1983

Attendances

In recent seasons Östers IF have had the following average attendances:

Footnotes
A Current youth players who at least have sat on the bench in a competitive match.

B. The title of "Swedish Champions" has been awarded to the winner of four different competitions over the years. Between 1896 and 1925 the title was awarded to the winner of Svenska Mästerskapet, a stand-alone cup tournament. No clubs were given the title between 1926 and 1930 even though the first-tier league Allsvenskan was played. In 1931 the title was reinstated and awarded to the winner of Allsvenskan. Between 1982 and 1990 a play-off in cup format was held at the end of the league season to decide the champions. After the play-off format in 1991 and 1992 the title was decided by the winner of Mästerskapsserien, an additional league after the end of Allsvenskan. Since the 1993 season the title has once again been awarded to the winner of Allsvenskan.

References

External links
 Östers IF – official site
  – supporter site

 
Football clubs in Kronoberg County
Allsvenskan clubs
Sport in Växjö
Defunct bandy clubs in Sweden
Bandy clubs established in 1930
Association football clubs established in 1930
1930 establishments in Sweden
Svenska Cupen winners